The following is a bibliography of New York. New York is a U.S. state in the Mid-Atlantic region of the Northeastern United States. New York is commonly known as the "Empire State" and sometimes the "Excelsior State". It is the nation's third most populous state at over 19 million people. The capital of the state is Albany and its most populous city is New York City. New York is often referred to as New York State to distinguish it from New York City.

General reference 
 
 Livermore, Garet D. "Revisiting 'The Cooperstown Idea': The Evolution of the New York State Historical Association." Public Historian 33.3 (2011): 70-89 https://doi.org/10.1525/tph.2011.33.3.70

History

General history 
 
 Dearstyne, Bruce W. ed. The Spirit of New York: Defining Events in the Empire State's History (2015) excerpt
 
 
 Ingalls, Robert P. Herbert H. Lehman and New York's Little New Deal (1975) online on 1930s

Colonial times 
 
  online free
  (satire)
 Kupperberg, Paul, ed. A Primary Source History of the Colony of New York (The Rosen Publishing Group, 2005).

Specialty topics 

 Baker, Paula. The Moral Frameworks of Public Life: Gender, Politics, and the State in Rural New York, 1870–1930 (1991)
 Bernstein, Peter L. Wedding of the Waters: The Erie Canal and the Making of a Great Nation (2005).
 Boles, James M. When There Were Poor Houses: Early Care in Rural New York 1808–1950 (2011)
 Cross, Whitney R. The Burned-over District; the social and intellectual history of enthusiastic religion in western New York, 1800–1850 (1950) online
 Goodier, Susan. No votes for women: the New York state anti-suffrage movement (U of Illinois Press, 2012).
 Gunn, L. Ray. "The Crisis of Authority in the Antebellum States: New York, 1820-1860." Review of Politics 41.2 (1979): 273-297 online.
 Fein, Michael R. Paving the way: New York road building and the American State, 1880–1956 (UP of Kansas, 2008).
 Haydon, Roger, ed. Upstate travels : British views of nineteenth-century New York (1982) online
 Johnson, Curtis D. Islands of Holiness: Rural Religion in Upstate New York, 1790–1860 (2012)
 Koeppel, Gerard. Bond of Union: Building the Erie Canal and the American Empire. (2009).
 Norton, John R. "New York State Government and the Economy: 1819-1846." New York History 34.3 (1953): 298-314 online.
 Plotch, Philip Mark. Politics Across the Hudson: The Tappan Zee Megaproject (Rutgers UP, 2018).
 Sernett, Milton.  North Star Country: Upstate New York and the Crusade for African American Freedom (2001).
 Sowers, Don Conger. The financial history of New York State from 1789 to 1912 (1914) online.
 Starr, Timothy. Railroad Wars of New York State (Arcadia, 2012).
  Taft, Pauline Dakin. The happy valley; the elegant eighties in upstate New York (1965) online; heavily illustrated
 Wellman, Judith. Grassroots Reform in the Burned-over District of Upstate New York: Religion, Abolitionism, and Democracy (2016)
 Wilson, Edmund. Upstate: records and recollections of northern New York (1971) online

By municipality

By city

Albany

Buffalo 
 Borchert, James, and Susan Borchert. "Downtown, Uptown, Out of Town: Diverging Patterns of Upper-Class Residential Landscapes in Buffalo, Pittsburgh, and Cleveland, 1885-1935." Social Science History 26.2 (2002): 311–346.
 Gerber, David A. The Making of an American Pluralism: Buffalo, New York, 1825–60 (U of Illinois Press, 1989)
 Goldman, Mark. High hopes: The rise and decline of Buffalo, New York (Suny Press, 1983)

Saratoga Springs

Troy

By county

Rensselaer County

Topics 
 Curran, Robert Emmett, ed. Shaping American Catholicism: Maryland and New York, 1805–1915 (2012) excerpt and text search

See also 

 Topic overview:
 New York
 Outline of New York
 Index of New York-related articles

New York
New York (state)